Just Like Old Times is the début album by singer-songwriter Heather Myles. It was released in 1992 via HighTone Records.

Reviews
The album received a positive review in Billboard, which compared her vocals favorably to Loretta Lynn and Connie Smith. People was also favorable, with an uncredited review calling it "a rousing, Bakersfield-influenced sleeper by a dynamic singer."

Track listing
"Love Lyin' Down" (Heather Myles) – 3:06
"Why I'm Walking" (Stonewall Jackson, Melvin Endsley) – 2:46
"Changes" (Heather Myles) – 3:33
"Rum and Rodeo" (Heather Myles) – 3:55
"Make a Fool Out of Me" (Heather Myles, David Amy) – 3:14
"The Other Side of Town" (Heather Myles) – 3:15
"Just Like Old Times" (David Amy, Rick Shea, Gary Brandin, Heather Myles) – 3:03
"Stay Out of My Arms" (Jim Lauderdale) – 2:20
"I Love You, Goodbye" (Heather Myles) – 3:12
"Lovin' the Bottle" (Gary Brandin) – 2:27
"One Good Reason Why" (Heather Myles, Denise Hart) – 3:52
"Playin' in the Dirt" (David Amy, Robert Cray) – 3:34

References

Heather Myles albums
1992 albums